Kogu is a large village in Biu LGA, of southwestern Borno State, in northeastern Nigeria.

Mari Watirwa, the 20th Emir of Biu, established his capital at Kogu about 1795, after he drove the Fulani out of Biu. In 1838, his  grandson, Emir Mari Biya, moved the capital to the town of Biu.

Notes

External links
"Kogu Map — Satellite Images of Kogu" Maplandia World Gazetteer

Populated places in Borno State